Mustafino (Mostafa) is a rural locality (a village) in Batyrovsky Selsoviet, Aurgazinsky District, Bashkortostan, Russia. The population was 432 as of 2010. There are 9 streets.

Geography 
Mustafino is located 19 km northeast of Tolbazy (the district's administrative centre) by road. Novomustafino is the nearest rural locality.

References 

Rural localities in Aurgazinsky District